Robert Freeman Leverett (born August 5, 1964) is an American politician from Georgia. Leverett is a Republican member of Georgia House of Representatives for District 33.

References

Official links
Official Website

Republican Party members of the Georgia House of Representatives
21st-century American politicians
Living people
1964 births